

Events

Pre-1600
 229 – Sun Quan proclaims himself emperor of Eastern Wu.
1266 – War of Saint Sabas: In the Battle of Trapani, the Venetians defeat a larger Genoese fleet, capturing all its ships.
1280 – The Spanish Reconquista: In the Battle of Moclín the Emirate of Granada ambush a superior pursuing force, killing most of them in a military disaster for the Kingdom of Castile.
1305 – A peace treaty between the Flemish and the French is signed at Athis-sur-Orge.
1314 – First War of Scottish Independence: The Battle of Bannockburn (south of Stirling) begins.
1532 – Henry VIII of England and Francis I of France sign the "Treaty of Closer Amity With France" (also known as the Pommeraye treaty), pledging mutual aid against Charles V, Holy Roman Emperor.
1565 – Dragut, commander of the Ottoman navy, dies during the Great Siege of Malta.
1594 – The Action of Faial, Azores. The Portuguese carrack Cinco Chagas, loaded with slaves and treasure, is attacked and sunk by English ships with only 13 survivors out of over 700 on board.

1601–1900
1611 – The mutinous crew of Henry Hudson's fourth voyage sets Henry, his son and seven loyal crew members adrift in an open boat in what is now Hudson Bay; they are never heard from again.
1683 – William Penn signs a friendship treaty with Lenni Lenape Indians in Pennsylvania.
1713 – The French residents of Acadia are given one year to declare allegiance to Britain or leave Nova Scotia, Canada.
1757 – Battle of Plassey: Three thousand British troops under Robert Clive defeat a 50,000-strong Indian army under Siraj ud-Daulah at Plassey.
1758 – Seven Years' War: Battle of Krefeld: British, Hanoverian, and Prussian forces defeat French troops at Krefeld in Germany.
1760 – Seven Years' War: Battle of Landeshut: Austria defeats Prussia.
1780 – American Revolution: Battle of Springfield fought in and around Springfield, New Jersey (including Short Hills, formerly of Springfield, now of Millburn Township).
1794 – Empress Catherine II of Russia grants Jews permission to settle in Kyiv.
1810 – John Jacob Astor forms the Pacific Fur Company.
1812 – War of 1812: Great Britain revokes the restrictions on American commerce, thus eliminating one of the chief reasons for going to war.
1860 – The United States Congress establishes the Government Printing Office.
1865 – American Civil War: At Fort Towson in the Oklahoma Territory, Confederate Brigadier General Stand Watie surrenders the last significant Confederate army.
1868 – Christopher Latham Sholes received a patent for an invention he called the "Type-Writer".
1887 – The Rocky Mountains Park Act becomes law in Canada creating the nation's first national park, Banff National Park.
1894 – The International Olympic Committee is founded at the Sorbonne in Paris, at the initiative of Baron Pierre de Coubertin.

1901–present
1913 – Second Balkan War: The Greeks defeat the Bulgarians in the Battle of Doiran.
1914 – Mexican Revolution: Pancho Villa takes Zacatecas from Victoriano Huerta.
1917 – In a game against the Washington Senators, Boston Red Sox pitcher Ernie Shore retires 26 batters in a row after replacing Babe Ruth, who had been ejected for punching the umpire.
1919 – Estonian War of Independence: The decisive defeat of the Baltische Landeswehr in the Battle of Cēsis; this date is celebrated as Victory Day in Estonia.
1926 – The College Board administers the first SAT exam.
1931 – Wiley Post and Harold Gatty take off from Roosevelt Field, Long Island in an attempt to circumnavigate the world in a single-engine plane.
1938 – The Civil Aeronautics Act is signed into law, forming the Civil Aeronautics Authority in the United States.
1940 – Adolf Hitler goes on a three-hour tour of the architecture of Paris with architect Albert Speer and sculptor Arno Breker in his only visit to the city.
  1940   – Henry Larsen begins the first successful west-to-east navigation of Northwest Passage from Vancouver, British Columbia, Canada.
1941 – The Lithuanian Activist Front declares independence from the Soviet Union and forms the Provisional Government of Lithuania; it lasts only briefly as the Nazis will occupy Lithuania a few weeks later.
1942 – World War II: Germany's latest fighter aircraft, a Focke-Wulf Fw 190, is captured intact when it mistakenly lands at RAF Pembrey in Wales.
1946 – The 1946 Vancouver Island earthquake strikes Vancouver Island, British Columbia, Canada.
1947 – The United States Senate follows the United States House of Representatives in overriding U.S. President Harry S. Truman's veto of the Taft–Hartley Act.
1951 – The ocean liner SS United States is christened and launched.
1956 – The French National Assembly takes the first step in creating the French Community by passing the Loi Cadre, transferring a number of powers from Paris to elected territorial governments in French West Africa.
1959 – Convicted Manhattan Project spy Klaus Fuchs is released after only nine years in prison and allowed to emigrate to Dresden, East Germany where he resumes a scientific career.
1960 – The United States Food and Drug Administration declares Enovid to be the first officially approved combined oral contraceptive pill in the world.
1961 – The Antarctic Treaty System, which sets aside Antarctica as a scientific preserve and limits military activity on the continent, its islands and ice shelves, comes into force.
1967 – Cold War: U.S. President Lyndon B. Johnson meets with Soviet Premier Alexei Kosygin in Glassboro, New Jersey for the three-day Glassboro Summit Conference.
1969 – Warren E. Burger is sworn in as Chief Justice of the United States Supreme Court by retiring Chief Justice Earl Warren.
  1969   – IBM announces that effective January 1970 it will price its software and services separately from hardware thus creating the modern software industry.
1972 – Watergate scandal: U.S. President Richard M. Nixon and White House Chief of Staff H. R. Haldeman are taped talking about illegally using the Central Intelligence Agency to obstruct the Federal Bureau of Investigation's investigation into the Watergate break-ins.
  1972   – Title IX of the United States Civil Rights Act of 1964 is amended to prohibit sexual discrimination to any educational program receiving federal funds.
1973 – A fire at a house in Hull, England, which kills a six-year-old boy is passed off as an accident; it later emerges as the first of 26 deaths by fire caused over the next seven years by serial arsonist Peter Dinsdale.
1985 – A terrorist bomb explodes at Narita International Airport near Tokyo. An hour later, the same group detonates a second bomb aboard Air India Flight 182, bringing the Boeing 747 down off the coast of Ireland killing all 329 aboard.
1991 – Sonic the Hedgehog is released in North America on the Sega Genesis platform, beginning the popular video game franchise.
1994 – NASA's Space Station Processing Facility, a new state-of-the-art manufacturing building for the International Space Station, officially opens at Kennedy Space Center.
2001 – The 8.4  southern Peru earthquake shakes coastal Peru with a maximum Mercalli intensity of VIII (Severe). A destructive tsunami followed, leaving at least 74 people dead, and 2,687 injured.
2012 – Ashton Eaton breaks the decathlon world record at the United States Olympic Trials.
2013 – Nik Wallenda becomes the first man to successfully walk across the Grand Canyon on a tight rope.
  2013   – Militants storm a high-altitude mountaineering base camp near Nanga Parbat in Gilgit–Baltistan, Pakistan, killing ten climbers and a local guide.
2014 – The last of Syria's declared chemical weapons are shipped out for destruction.
2016 – The United Kingdom votes in a referendum to leave the European Union, by 52% to 48%.
2017 – A series of terrorist attacks take place in Pakistan, resulting in 96 deaths and wounding 200 others.
2018 – Twelve boys and an assistant coach from a soccer team in Thailand are trapped in a flooding cave, leading to an 18-day rescue operation.

Births

Pre-1600
47 BC – Caesarion, Egyptian king (d. 30 BC)
1385 – Stephen, Count Palatine of Simmern-Zweibrücken (d. 1459)
1433 – Francis II, Duke of Brittany (d. 1488)
1456 – Margaret of Denmark, Queen of Scotland (d. 1486)
1489 – Charles II, Duke of Savoy, Italian nobleman (d. 1496)
1534 – Oda Nobunaga, Japanese warlord (d. 1582)
1596 – Johan Banér, Swedish field marshal (d. 1641)

1601–1900
1616 – Shah Shuja, Mughal prince (d. 1661)
1625 – John Fell, English churchman and influential academic (d. 1686)
1668 – Giambattista Vico, Italian jurist, historian, and philosopher (d. 1744)
1683 – Étienne Fourmont, French orientalist and sinologist (d. 1745)
1711 – Giovanni Battista Guadagnini, Italian instrument maker (d. 1786)
1716 – Fletcher Norton, 1st Baron Grantley, English lawyer and politician, Solicitor General for England and Wales (d. 1789)
1750 – Déodat Gratet de Dolomieu, French geologist and academic (d. 1801)
1763 – Joséphine de Beauharnais, French wife of Napoleon I (d. 1814)
1799 – John Milton Bernhisel, American physician and politician (d. 1881)
1800 – Karol Marcinkowski, Polish physician and activist (d. 1846)
1824 – Carl Reinecke, German pianist, composer, and conductor (d. 1910)
1843 – Paul Heinrich von Groth, German scientist (d. 1927)
1860 – Albert Giraud, Belgian poet and librarian (d. 1929)
1863 – Sándor Bródy, Hungarian author and journalist (d. 1924)
1877 – Norman Pritchard, Indian-English hurdler and actor (d. 1929)
1879 – Huda Sha'arawi, Egyptian feminist and journalist (d. 1947)
1884 – Cyclone Taylor, Canadian ice hockey player and politician (d. 1979)
1888 – Bronson M. Cutting, American publisher and politician (d. 1935)
1889 – Anna Akhmatova, Ukrainian-Russian poet and author (d. 1966)
  1889   – Verena Holmes, English engineer (d. 1964)
1894 – Harold Barrowclough, New Zealand military leader, lawyer and Chief Justice (d. 1972)
  1894   – Alfred Kinsey, American entomologist and sexologist (d. 1956)
  1894   – Edward VIII, King of the United Kingdom (d. 1972)
1899 – Amédée Gordini, Italian-born French race car driver and sports car manufacturer (d. 1979)
1900 – Blanche Noyes, American aviator, winner of the 1936 Bendix Trophy Race (d. 1981)

1901–present
1901 – Ahmet Hamdi Tanpınar, Turkish author, poet, and scholar (d. 1962)
1903 – Paul Martin Sr., Canadian lawyer and politician (d. 1992)
1904 – Quintin McMillan, South African cricketer (d. 1938)
1905 – Jack Pickersgill, Canadian civil servant and politician, 35th Secretary of State for Canada (d. 1997)
1906 – Tribhuvan of Nepal (d. 1955)
1907 – Dercy Gonçalves, Brazilian actress and singer (d. 2008)
  1907   – James Meade, English economist and academic, Nobel Prize laureate (d. 1995)
1909 – David Lewis, Russian-Canadian lawyer and politician (d. 1981)
  1909   – Georges Rouquier, French actor, director, and screenwriter (d. 1989)
1910 – Jean Anouilh, French playwright and screenwriter (d. 1987)
  1910   – Gordon B. Hinckley, American religious leader, 15th President of The Church of Jesus Christ of Latter-day Saints (d. 2008)
  1910   – Milt Hinton, American bassist and photographer (d. 2000)
  1910   – Bill King, English yachtsman, naval commander and author (d. 2012)
  1910   – Lawson Little, American golfer (d. 1968)
1912 – Alan Turing, English mathematician and computer scientist (d. 1954)
1913 – William P. Rogers, American commander, lawyer, and politician, 55th United States Secretary of State (d. 2001)
1915 – Frances Gabe, American artist and inventor (d. 2016)
1916 – Len Hutton, English cricketer and soldier (d. 1990)
  1916   – Irene Worth, American actress (d. 2002) 
  1916   – Al G. Wright, American bandleader and conductor (d. 2020)
1919 – Mohamed Boudiaf, Algerian politician, President of Algeria (d. 1992)
1920 – Saleh Ajeery, Kuwaiti astronomer (d. 2022)
1921 – Paul Findley, American politician (d. 2019)
1922 – Morris R. Jeppson, American lieutenant and physicist (d. 2010)
  1922   – Hal Laycoe, Canadian ice hockey player and coach (d. 1998)
1923 – Peter Corr, Irish-English footballer and manager (d. 2001)
  1923   – Elroy Schwartz, American screenwriter and producer (d. 2013)
  1923   – Doris Johnson, American politician
  1923   – Jerry Rullo, American professional basketball player (d. 2016)
  1923   – Giuseppina Tuissi, Italian communist and Partisan (d. 1945)
1924 – Frank Bolle, American comic-strip artist, comic-book artist and illustrator (d. 2020)
1925 – Miriam Karlin, English actress (d. 2011)
  1925   – Art Modell, American businessman (d. 2012)
  1925   – Anna Chennault, Chinese widow of Lieutenant General Claire Lee Chennault (d. 2018)
1926 – Lawson Soulsby, Baron Soulsby of Swaffham Prior, English microbiologist and parasitologist (d. 2017)
  1926   – Magda Herzberger, Romanian author, poet and composer, survivor of the Holocaust (d. 2021)
  1926   – Annette Mbaye d'Erneville, Senegalese writer
  1926   – Arnaldo Pomodoro, Italian sculptor
1927 – Bob Fosse, American actor, dancer, choreographer, and director (d. 1987)
  1927   – John Habgood, Baron Habgood, English archbishop (d. 2019)
1928 – Jean Cione, American baseball player (d. 2010)
  1928   – Klaus von Dohnányi, German politician
  1928   – Michael Shaara, American author and academic (d. 1988)
1929 – June Carter Cash, American singer-songwriter, musician, and actress (d. 2003)
  1929   – Mario Ghella, Italian racing cyclist
1930 – Donn F. Eisele, American colonel, pilot, and astronaut (d. 1987)
  1930   – John Elliott, English historian and academic (d. 2022) 
  1930   – Francis Newall, 2nd Baron Newall, English businessman and politician
  1930   – Anthony Thwaite, English poet, critic, and academic (d. 2021)
  1930   – Marie-Thérèse Houphouët-Boigny, former First Lady of Ivory Coast
1931 – Gunnar Uusi, Estonian chess player (d. 1981)
  1931   – Ola Ullsten, Swedish politician and diplomat (d. 2018)
1932 – Peter Millett, Baron Millett, English lawyer and judge (d. 2021)
1934 – Keith Sutton, English bishop (d. 2017)
  1934   – Bill Torrey, Canadian businessman (d. 2018)
  1934   – Virbhadra Singh, Indian politician (d. 2021)
1935 – Maurice Ferré, Puerto Rican-American politician, 32nd Mayor of Miami (d. 2019)
  1935   – Keith Burkinshaw, English footballer and manager
1936 – Richard Bach, American novelist and essayist
  1936   – Costas Simitis, Greek economist, lawyer, and politician, 180th Prime Minister of Greece
1937 – Martti Ahtisaari, Finnish captain and politician, 10th President of Finland, Nobel Prize laureate
  1937   – Alan Haselhurst, English academic and politician
  1937   – Niki Sullivan, American guitarist and songwriter  (d. 2004)
1939 – Scott Burton, American sculptor (d. 1989)
1940 – Adam Faith, English singer (d. 2003)
  1940   – George Feigley, American sex cult leader and two-time prison escapee (d. 2009)
  1940   – Derry Irvine, Baron Irvine of Lairg, Scottish lawyer, judge, and politician, Lord High Chancellor of Great Britain
  1940   – Wilma Rudolph, American runner (d. 1994)
  1940   – Mike Shrimpton, New Zealand cricketer and coach (d. 2015)
  1940   – Stuart Sutcliffe, Scottish painter and musician (d. 1962)
  1940   – Diana Trask, Australian singer-songwriter
1941 – Robert Hunter, American singer-songwriter and guitarist (d. 2019)
  1941   – Roger McDonald, Australian author and screenwriter
  1941   – Keith Newton, English footballer (d. 1998)
1942 – Martin Rees, Baron Rees of Ludlow, English cosmologist and astrophysicist
1943 – Patrick Bokanowski, French filmmaker
  1943   – Ellyn Kaschak, American psychologist and academic
  1943   – James Levine, American pianist and conductor (d. 2021)
1945 – Kjell Albin Abrahamson, Swedish journalist and author (d. 2016)
  1945   – John Garang, Sudanese colonel and politician, President of Southern Sudan (d. 2005)
1946 – Julian Hipwood, English polo player and coach
  1946   – Ted Shackelford, American actor
1947 – Bryan Brown, Australian actor and producer
1948 – Clarence Thomas, American lawyer and jurist, Associate Justice of the Supreme Court of the United States
1949 – Gordon Bray, Australian journalist and sportscaster
  1949   – Sheila Noakes, Baroness Noakes, English accountant and politician
1951 – Angelo Falcón, Puerto Rican-American political scientist, activist, and academic, founded the National Institute for Latino Policy (d. 2018)
  1951   – Michèle Mouton, French race car driver and manager
1952 – Raj Babbar, Indian actor and politician
1953 – Armen Sarkissian, Armenian physicist, politician and President of Armenia
1955 – Pierre Corbeil, Canadian dentist and politician
  1955   – Glenn Danzig, American singer-songwriter and producer 
  1955   – Jean Tigana, French footballer and manager
1956 – Daniel J. Drucker, Canadian academic and educator 
  1956   – Tony Hill, American football player and sportscaster
  1956   – Randy Jackson, American bass player and producer 
1957 – Dave Houghton, Zimbabwean cricketer and coach
  1957   – Frances McDormand, American actress, winner of the Triple Crown of Acting
1958 – John Hayes, English politician, Minister of State at the Department of Energy and Climate Change
1960 – Donald Harrison, American saxophonist, composer, and producer
  1960   – Tatsuya Uemura, Japanese composer and programmer
1961 – Richard Arnold, English lawyer and judge
  1961   – Zoran Janjetov, Serbian singer and illustrator 
  1961   – LaSalle Thompson, American basketball player, coach, and manager
1962 – Chuck Billy, American singer-songwriter and guitarist
1963 – Colin Montgomerie, Scottish golfer
1964 – Nicolas Marceau, Canadian economist and politician
  1964   – Tara Morice, Australian actress and singer
  1964   – Joss Whedon, American director, producer, and screenwriter
  1964   – Lou Yun, Chinese gymnast
1965 – Paul Arthurs, English guitarist 
  1965   – Sylvia Mathews Burwell, American government and non-profit executive
  1965   – Peter O'Malley, Australian golfer 
1966 – Chico DeBarge, American singer and pianist 
1969 – Martin Klebba, American actor, producer, and stuntman
1970 – Robert Brooks, American football player
  1970   – Martin Deschamps, Canadian singer-songwriter 
  1970   – Yann Tiersen, French singer-songwriter and guitarist
1971 – Fred Ewanuick, Canadian actor and producer
  1971   – Félix Potvin, Canadian ice hockey player and coach
1972 – Selma Blair, American actress
  1972   – Louis Van Amstel, Dutch dancer and choreographer
  1972   – Zinedine Zidane, French footballer and manager
1974 – Joel Edgerton, Australian actor
  1974   – Mark Hendrickson, American basketball and baseball player
1975 – Kevin Dyson, American football player and coach
  1975   – David Howell, English golfer
  1975   – Mike James, American basketball player
  1975   – KT Tunstall, Scottish singer-songwriter and musician
1976 – Wade Barrett, American soccer player and manager
  1976   – Joe Becker, American guitarist and composer
  1976   – Savvas Poursaitidis, Greek-Cypriot footballer and scout
  1976   – Brandon Stokley, American football player
  1976   – Paola Suárez, Argentinian tennis player
  1976   – Emmanuelle Vaugier, Canadian actress and singer
  1976   – Patrick Vieira, French footballer and manager
1977 – Miguel Ángel Angulo, Spanish footballer
  1977   – Hayden Foxe, Australian footballer and manager
  1977   – Jaan Jüris, Estonian ski jumper
  1977   – Jason Mraz, American singer-songwriter and guitarist
  1977   – Shaun O'Hara, American football player and sportscaster
1978 – Memphis Bleek, American rapper, producer, and actor
  1978   – Frederic Leclercq, French heavy metal musician
  1978   – Matt Light, American football player and sportscaster
1979 – LaDainian Tomlinson, American football player 
1980 – Becky Cloonan, American author and illustrator
  1980   – Melissa Rauch, American actress
  1980   – Francesca Schiavone, Italian tennis player
1981 – Antony Costa, English singer-songwriter 
  1981   – Rolf Wacha, German rugby player
1982 – Derek Boogaard, Canadian-American ice hockey player (d. 2011)
1983 – Brooks Laich, Canadian ice hockey player
  1983   – José Manuel Rojas, Chilean footballer
1984 – Duffy, Welsh singer-songwriter and actress
  1984   – Takeshi Matsuda, Japanese swimmer
  1984   – Levern Spencer, Saint Lucian high jumper
1985 – Marcel Reece, American football player
1986 – Christy Altomare, American actress and singer-songwriter 
1987 – Alessia Filippi, Italian swimmer
1988 – Chet Faker, Australian singer-songwriter
  1988   – Chellsie Memmel, American gymnast
1989 – Lisa Carrington, New Zealand flatwater canoeist
  1989   – Jordan Nolan, Canadian ice hockey player
1990 – Clevid Dikamona, French footballer
  1990   – Vasek Pospisil, Canadian tennis player
  1990   – Laura Ràfols, Spanish footballer
1991 – Katie Armiger, American singer-songwriter and guitarist
1992 – Luiza Galiulina, Uzbekistani gymnast
  1992   – Nampalys Mendy, French footballer
1993 – Tim Anderson, American baseball player
  1993   – Marvin Grumann, German footballer
1994 – Ben Dwarshuis, Australian cricketer
2000 – Starford To'a, New Zealand rugby league player
2007 – Elliana Walmsley, American dancer
2008 – Lilliana Ketchman, American dancer and YouTuber

Deaths

Pre-1600
79 – Vespasian, Roman emperor (b. AD 9) 
 679 – Æthelthryth, English saint (b. 636)
 947 – Li Congyi, prince of Later Tang (b. 931)
   947   – Wang, imperial consort of Later Tang
 960 – Feng Yanji, chancellor of Southern Tang (b. 903)
 994 – Lothair Udo I, count of Stade (b. 950)
1018 – Henry I, margrave of Austria
1137 – Adalbert of Mainz, German archbishop
1222 – Constance of Aragon, Hungarian queen (b. 1179)
1290 – Henryk IV Probus, duke of Wrocław and high duke of Kraków (b. c. 1258)
1314 – Henry de Bohun, English knight
1324 – Aymer de Valence, 2nd Earl of Pembroke (b. 1270)
1343 – Giacomo Gaetani Stefaneschi, Italian cardinal (b. c. 1270)
1356 – Margaret II, Holy Roman Empress (b. 1311)
1537 – Pedro de Mendoza, Spanish conquistador (b. 1487)
1565 – Dragut, Ottoman admiral (b. 1485)
1582 – Shimizu Muneharu, Japanese commander (b. 1537)

1601–1900
1615 – Mashita Nagamori, Japanese daimyō (b. 1545)
1677 – William Louis, duke of Württemberg (b. 1647)
1686 – William Coventry, English politician (b. 1628)
1707 – John Mill, English theologian and author (b. 1645)
1733 – Johann Jakob Scheuchzer, Swiss paleontologist and scholar (b. 1672)
1770 – Mark Akenside, English poet and physician (b. 1721)
1775 – Karl Ludwig von Pöllnitz, German adventurer and author (b. 1692)
1779 – Mikael Sehul, Ethiopian warlord (b. 1691)
1806 – Mathurin Jacques Brisson, French zoologist and philosopher (b. 1723)
1811 – Nicolau Tolentino de Almeida, Portuguese poet and author (b. 1740)
1832 – Sir James Hall, 4th Baronet, Scottish geologist and geophysicist (b. 1761)
1836 – James Mill, Scottish economist, historian, and philosopher (b. 1773)
1848 – Maria Leopoldine of Austria-Este, Electress of Bavaria (b. 1776)
1856 – Ivan Kireyevsky, Russian philosopher and critic (b. 1806)
1881 – Matthias Jakob Schleiden, German botanist and academic (b. 1804)
1891 – Wilhelm Eduard Weber, German physicist and academic (b. 1804)
  1891   – Samuel Newitt Wood, American lawyer and politician (b. 1825)
1893 – William Fox, English-New Zealand lawyer and politician, 2nd Prime Minister of New Zealand (b. 1812)
  1893   – Theophilus Shepstone, English-South African politician (b. 1817)

1901–present
1914 – Bhaktivinoda Thakur, Indian guru and philosopher (b. 1838) 
1945 – Giuseppina Tuissi, Italian journalist and activist (b. 1923)
1953 – Albert Gleizes, French painter (b. 1881)
1954 – Salih Omurtak, Turkish general (b. 1889)
1956 – Reinhold Glière, Russian composer and educator (b. 1875)
1959 – Boris Vian, French author, poet, and playwright (b. 1920)
  1959   – Hidir Lutfi, Iraqi poet. (b. 1880)
1969 – Volmari Iso-Hollo, Finnish runner (b. 1907)
1970 – Roscoe Turner, American soldier and pilot (b. 1895)
1973 – Gerry Birrell, Scottish race car driver (b. 1944)
1980 – Sanjay Gandhi, Indian engineer and politician (b. 1946)
  1980   – Clyfford Still, American painter and academic (b. 1904)
1989 – Werner Best, German police officer and jurist (b. 1903)
1990 – Harindranath Chattopadhyay, Indian poet, actor, and politician (b. 1898)
1992 – Eric Andolsek, American football player (b. 1966)
1995 – Roger Grimsby, American journalist (b. 1928)
  1995   – Jonas Salk, American biologist and physician (b. 1914)
  1995   – Anatoli Tarasov, Russian ice hockey player and coach (b. 1918)
1996 – Andreas Papandreou, Greek economist and politician, 174th Prime Minister of Greece (b. 1919)
  1996   – Ray Lindwall, Australian cricketer and rugby player (b. 1921)
1997 – Betty Shabazz, American educator and activist (b. 1936)
1998 – Maureen O'Sullivan, Irish-American actress (b. 1911)
2000 – Peter Dubovský, Slovak footballer (b. 1972)
2002 – Pedro Alcázar, Panamanian boxer (b. 1975)
2005 – Shana Alexander, American journalist and author (b. 1926)
  2005   – Manolis Anagnostakis, Greek poet and critic (b. 1925)
2006 – Aaron Spelling, American actor, producer, and screenwriter, founded Spelling Television (b. 1923)
2007 – Rod Beck, American baseball player (b. 1968)
2008 – Claudio Capone, Italian-Scottish actor (b. 1952)
  2008   – Arthur Chung, Guyanese surveyor and politician, 1st President of Guyana (b. 1918)
  2008   – Marian Glinka, Polish actor and bodybuilder (b. 1943)
2009 – Raymond Berthiaume, Canadian singer-songwriter and producer (b. 1931)
  2009   – Ed McMahon, American game show host and announcer (b. 1923)
  2009   – Jerri Nielsen, American physician and explorer (b. 1952)
2010 – John Burton, Australian public servant and diplomat (b. 1915)
2011 – Peter Falk, American actor (b. 1927)
  2011   – Dennis Marshall, Costa Rican footballer (b. 1985)
  2011   – Fred Steiner, American composer and conductor (b. 1923)
2012 – James Durbin, English economist and statistician (b. 1923)
  2012   – Brigitte Engerer, French pianist and educator (b. 1952)
  2012   – Alan McDonald, Northern Ireland footballer and manager (b. 1963)
  2012   – Frank Chee Willeto, American soldier and politician, 4th Vice President of the Navajo Nation (b. 1925)
  2012   – Walter J. Zable, American football player and businessman, founded the Cubic Corporation (b. 1915)
2013 – Bobby Bland, American singer-songwriter (b. 1930)
  2013   – Gary David Goldberg, American screenwriter and producer (b. 1944)
  2013   – Frank Kelso, American admiral and politician, United States Secretary of the Navy (b. 1933)
  2013   – Kurt Leichtweiss, German mathematician and academic (b. 1927)
  2013   – Richard Matheson, American author and screenwriter (b. 1926)
  2013   – Darryl Read, English singer-songwriter, drummer, and actor (b. 1951)
  2013   – Sharon Stouder, American swimmer (b. 1948)
2014 – Nancy Garden, American author (b. 1938)
  2014   – Euros Lewis, Welsh cricketer (b. 1942)
  2014   – Paula Kent Meehan, American businesswoman, co-founded Redken (b. 1931)
2015 – Miguel Facussé Barjum, Honduran businessman (b. 1924)
  2015   – Nirmala Joshi, Indian nun, lawyer, and social worker (b. 1934)
  2015   – Dick Van Patten, American actor (b. 1928)
2016 – Ralph Stanley, American singer and banjo player (b. 1927)
2021 – John McAfee, British-American computer programmer and businessman, founded McAfee (b. 1945)

Holidays and observances
 Christian feast day:
 Æthelthryth
 Marie of Oignies
 Joseph Cafasso
 June 23 (Eastern Orthodox liturgics)
 Father's Day (Nicaragua, Poland)
 Grand Duke's Official Birthday (Luxembourg)
 International Widows Day (international)
 National Day of Remembrance for Victims of Terrorism (Canada)
 Okinawa Memorial Day (Okinawa Prefecture)
 Saint John's Eve and the first day of the Midsummer celebrations [although this is not the real summer solstice; see June 20] (Roman Catholic Church, Europe):
Bonfires of Saint John (Spain)
 First night of Festa de São João do Porto (Porto)
 First day of Golowan Festival (Cornwall)
 Jaaniõhtu (Estonia)
 Jāņi (Latvia)
 Kupala Night (Belarus, Lithuania, Poland, Russia, Ukraine)
 Last day of Drăgaica fair (Buzău, Romania)
 United Nations Public Service Day (International)
 Victory Day (Estonia)

References

External links

 
 
 

Days of the year
June